Elimination is Jughead's Revenge's third studio album, released in 1994. It was the first of the band's catalog to be licensed to and distributed by BYO Records. Although Elimination was not commercially successful, Jughead's Revenge gained critical recognition for the album and supported Face to Face on their first Canadian tour.

Elimination marked the first Jughead's Revenge album to be recorded as a four-piece; second guitarist George Snow had left the band in 1993 to play in the Bad Samaritans full-time. It was also their last album to feature drummer Nenus Givargus, who left for family related business.

Track listing
All tracks by Joe Doherty & Joey Rimicci except where noted.

 "Eliminator" – 2:12
 "True Enemy" – 1:46
 "Silver Spoon" (Doherty) – 2:05
 "Measured in Time" – 3:05
 "Show the World" – 2:15
 "Angels" (Doherty, Brian Priess) – 1:43
 "C-Biscuit" – 1:55
 "Red" – 2:19
 "Breaking Worlds" – 1:48
 "Do and Die" – 3:38
 "Get By" – 1:46
 "The Message" – 2:12
 "Unlimited" – 2:48
 "Surfin' And Spyin' (The Go-Go's cover)" (Caffey, Smith) – 3:11

Personnel
 Joe Doherty − vocals
 Joey Rimicci − guitar
 Brian Preiss − bass
 Nenus Givargus − drums

References

1994 albums
Jughead's Revenge albums
BYO Records albums